Galatea (minor planet designation: 74 Galatea) is a large C-type main-belt asteroid. Its carbonaceous surface is very dark in color with an albedo of just 0.034. Galatea was found by the prolific comet discoverer Ernst Tempel on August 29, 1862, in Marseilles, France. It was his third asteroid discovery. It is named after one of the two Galateas in Greek mythology. A stellar occultation by Galatea was observed on September 8, 1987. The name Galatea has also been given to one of Neptune's satellites.

Photometric observations of this asteroid made during 2008 at the Organ Mesa Observatory in Las Cruces, New Mexico gave a light curve with a period of 17.270 ± 0.002 hours and a brightness variation of 0.08 ± 0.01 in magnitude. The curve displays four minima and four maxima. The spectra of the asteroid does not display evidence of aqueous alteration.

References

External links 
 
 

Background asteroids
Galatea
Galatea
C-type asteroids (Tholen)
C-type asteroids (SMASS)
18620829